Myles Porter (born November 22, 1985) is an American Paralympic judoka.

Biography
Myles was born in Fremont, Ohio and is currently attending University of Toledo. He was a 2007 bronze medalist at Parapan American Games and 2009 one too at Rendez-Vous, Montreal, Canada. He was a three-time golden medalist at German Open for Blind & Visually Impairment, Germany between 2009 and 2011. During both 2010 and 2011 respectively he won bronze medal as well, for his participation at IBSA World Judo Championships in Antalya, Turkey. In the same 2010 he was a gold medalist at Lithuanian Open for Blind & Visually Impaired which was held at the capital of Lithuania, Vilnius. In 2011 he pushed his limits at Parapan American Games and this time won a gold medal.

References

1985 births
Living people
People from Fremont, Ohio
American male judoka
Paralympic judoka of the United States
Paralympic silver medalists for the United States
Judoka at the 2012 Summer Paralympics
Medalists at the 2012 Summer Paralympics
Paralympic medalists in judo
Medalists at the 2007 Parapan American Games
Medalists at the 2011 Parapan American Games